Ahmed Safwat (1947–2003) was an Egyptian professional squash player.
Born in Cairo on 6 June 1947, he was the son of a diplomat and turned professional in 1971. He moved to London and won the British Professional Championship seven times. He reached the semi-finals of the 1977 Men's British Open Squash Championship when he was ranked the second best player in the world. He also represented Egypt at the 1981 & 1983 World Team Squash Championships.

After Ahmed stopped playing competitively he proceeded to train other young up and coming squash players.

Ahmed Safwat died on 30 July 2003 whilst in his home country. He was due to take part in an over 50s tournament which was subsequently named in his honour. Ahmed was survived by wife and their four children.

References

External links 
 

1947 births
2003 deaths
Egyptian male squash players
Sportspeople from Cairo
20th-century Egyptian people